Beijing, alternatively romanized as Peking, is the capital of the People's Republic of China. With over 21 million residents, Beijing is the world's most populous national capital city and is China's second largest city after Shanghai. It is located in Northern China, and is governed as a municipality under the direct administration of the State Council with 16 urban, suburban, and rural districts. Beijing is mostly surrounded by Hebei Province with the exception of neighboring Tianjin to the southeast; together, the three divisions form the Jingjinji megalopolis and the national capital region of China.

Beijing is a global city and one of the world's leading centres for culture, diplomacy, politics, finance, business and economics, education, research, language, tourism, media, sport, science and technology and transportation. As a megacity, Beijing is the second largest Chinese city by urban population after Shanghai. It is home to the headquarters of most of China's largest state-owned companies and houses the largest number of Fortune Global 500 companies in the world, as well as the world's four biggest financial institutions by total assets. It is also a major hub for the national highway, expressway, railway, and high-speed rail networks. The Beijing Capital International Airport has been the second busiest in the world by passenger traffic (Asia's busiest) since 2010, and, the city's subway network is the busiest and longest in the world. The Beijing Daxing International Airport, a second international airport in Beijing, is the largest single-structure airport terminal in the world.

Combining both modern and traditional style architectures, Beijing is one of the oldest cities in the world, with a rich history dating back over three millennia. As the last of the Four Great Ancient Capitals of China, Beijing has been the political center of the country for most of the past eight centuries, and was the largest city in the world by population for much of the second millennium CE. With mountains surrounding the inland city on three sides, in addition to the old inner and outer city walls, Beijing was strategically poised and developed to be the residence of the emperor and thus was the perfect location for the imperial capital. The city is renowned for its opulent palaces, temples, parks, gardens, tombs, walls and gates. Beijing is one of the most important tourist destinations of the world. In 2018, Beijing was the second highest earning tourist city in the world after Shanghai. Beijing is home to many national monuments and museums and has seven UNESCO World Heritage Sites—the Forbidden City, Temple of Heaven, Summer Palace, Ming Tombs, Zhoukoudian, and parts of the Great Wall and the Grand Canal—all of which are popular tourist locations. Siheyuans, the city's traditional housing style, and hutongs, the narrow alleys between siheyuans, are major tourist attractions and are common in urban Beijing.

Beijing's public universities make up more than one-fifth of Double First-Class Universities, and many of them consistently rank among the best in the Asia-Pacific and the world. Beijing is home to the two best C9 League universities (Tsinghua and Peking) in Asia & Oceania region and emerging countries. Beijing CBD is a center for Beijing's economic expansion, with the ongoing or recently completed construction of multiple skyscrapers. Beijing's Zhongguancun area is a world leading center of scientific and technological innovation as well as entrepreneurship. Beijing has been ranked the city with the largest scientific research output by the Nature Index since 2016. The city has hosted numerous international and national sporting events, the most notable being the 2008 Summer Olympics and 2008 Summer Paralympics Games. In 2022, Beijing became the first city ever to host both the Summer and Winter Olympics, and also the Summer and Winter Paralympics. Beijing hosts 175 foreign embassies as well as the headquarters of many organizations, including the Asian Infrastructure Investment Bank (AIIB), the Shanghai Cooperation Organisation (SCO), the Silk Road Fund, the Chinese Academy of Sciences, the Chinese Academy of Engineering, the Chinese Academy of Social Sciences, the Central Academy of Fine Arts, the Central Academy of Drama, the Central Conservatory of Music, and the Red Cross Society of China.

Etymology 

Over the past 3,000 years, the city of Beijing has had numerous other names. The English spelling Beijing is based on the government's official romanization (adopted in the 1980s) of the two characters as they are pronounced in Standard Mandarin. An older English spelling, Peking(北平 in Chinese meaning), was used by Jesuit missionary Martino Martini in a popular atlas published in Amsterdam in 1655. Although Peking is no longer the common name for the city, some of the city's older locations and facilities, such as Beijing Capital International Airport, with the IATA Code PEK, and Peking University, still retain the former romanization.

The official Latin alphabet abbreviation for Beijing is "BJ".

History

Early history 
The earliest traces of human habitation in the Peking municipality were found in the caves of Dragon Bone Hill near the village of Zhoukoudian in Fangshan District, where Peking Man lived. Homo erectus fossils from the caves date to 230,000 to 250,000 years ago. Paleolithic Homo sapiens also lived there more recently, about 27,000 years ago. Archaeologists have found neolithic settlements throughout the municipality, including in Wangfujing, located in central Peking.

The first walled city in Beijing was Jicheng, the capital city of the state of Ji and was built in 1045 BC. Within modern Beijing, Jicheng was located around the present Guang'anmen area in the south of Xicheng District. This settlement was later conquered by the state of Yan and made its capital.

Early Imperial China 

After the First Emperor unified China in 221 BC, Jicheng became a prefectural capital for the region. During the Three Kingdoms period, it was held by Gongsun Zan and Yuan Shao before falling to the Wei Kingdom of Cao Cao. The AD third-century Western Jin demoted the town, placing the prefectural seat in neighboring Zhuozhou. During the Sixteen Kingdoms period when northern China was conquered and divided by the Wu Hu, Jicheng was briefly the capital of the Xianbei Former Yan Kingdom.

After China was reunified by the Sui dynasty in 581, Jicheng, also known as Zhuojun, became the northern terminus of the Grand Canal. Under the Tang dynasty, Jicheng as Youzhou, served as a military frontier command center. During the An-Shi Rebellion and again amidst the turmoil of the late Tang, local military commanders founded their own short-lived Yan dynasties and called the city Yanjing, or the "Yan Capital." Also in the Tang dynasty, the city's name Jicheng was replaced by Youzhou or Yanjing. In 938, after the fall of the Tang, the Later Jin ceded the frontier territory including what is now Beijing to the Khitan Liao dynasty, which treated the city as Nanjing, or the "Southern Capital", one of four secondary capitals to complement its "Supreme Capital" Shangjing (modern Baarin Left Banner in Inner Mongolia). Some of the oldest surviving pagodas in Beijing date to the Liao period, including the Tianning Pagoda.

The Liao fell to the Jurchen Jin dynasty in 1122, which gave the city to the Song dynasty and then retook it in 1125 during its conquest of northern China. In 1153, the Jurchen Jin made Beijing their "Central Capital", or Zhongdu. The city was besieged by Genghis Khan's invading Mongolian army in 1213 and razed to the ground two years later. Two generations later, Kublai Khan ordered the construction of Dadu (or Daidu to the Mongols, commonly known as Khanbaliq), a new capital for his Yuan dynasty to the northeast of the Zhongdu ruins. The construction took from 1264 to 1293, but greatly enhanced the status of a city on the northern fringe of China proper. The city was centered on the Drum Tower slightly to the north of modern Beijing and stretched from the present-day Chang'an Avenue to the northern part of Line 10 subway. Remnants of the Yuan rammed earth wall still stand and are known as the Tucheng.

Ming dynasty 

In 1368, soon after declaring the new Hongwu era of the Ming dynasty, the rebel leader Zhu Yuanzhang captured Dadu/Khanbaliq and razed the Yuan palaces to the ground. Since the Yuan continued to occupy Shangdu and Mongolia, Dadu was used to supply the Ming military garrisons in the area and renamed Beiping (Wade–Giles: Peip'ing, "Northern Peace"). Under the Hongwu Emperor's feudal policies, Beiping was given to his son Zhu Di, who was created "Prince of Yan".

The early death of Zhu Yuanzhang's heir led to a succession struggle upon his death, one that ended with the victory of Zhu Di and the declaration of the new Yongle era. Since his harsh treatment of the Ming capital Yingtian (modern Nanjing) alienated many there, he established his fief as a new co-capital. The city of Beiping became Beijing ("Northern Capital") or Shuntian in 1403. The construction of the new imperial residence, the Forbidden City, took from 1406 to 1420; this period was also responsible for several other of the modern city's major attractions, such as the Temple of Heaven and Tian'anmen. On 28 October 1420, the city was officially designated the capital of the Ming dynasty in the same year that the Forbidden City was completed. Beijing became the empire's primary capital, and Yingtian, also called Nanjing ("Southern Capital"), became the co-capital. (A 1425 order by Zhu Di's son, the Hongxi Emperor, to return the primary capital to Nanjing was never carried out: he died, probably of a heart attack, the next month. He was buried, like almost every Ming emperor to follow him, in an elaborate necropolis to Beijing's north.)

By the 15th century, Beijing had essentially taken its current shape. The Ming city wall continued to serve until modern times, when it was pulled down and the 2nd Ring Road was built in its place. It is generally believed that Beijing was the largest city in the world for most of the 15th, 16th, 17th, and 18th centuries. The first known church was constructed by Catholics in 1652 at the former site of Matteo Ricci's chapel; the modern Nantang Cathedral was later built upon the same site.

The capture of Beijing by Li Zicheng's peasant army in 1644 ended the dynasty, but he and his Shun court abandoned the city without a fight when the Manchu army of Prince Dorgon arrived 40 days later.

Qing dynasty 

Dorgon established the Qing dynasty as a direct successor of the Ming (delegitimising Li Zicheng and his followers) and Beijing became China's sole capital. The Qing emperors made some modifications to the Imperial residence but, in large part, the Ming buildings and the general layout remained unchanged. Facilities for Manchu worship were introduced, but the Qing also continued the traditional state rituals. Signage was bilingual or Chinese. This early Qing Beijing later formed the setting for the Chinese novel Dream of the Red Chamber. Northwest of the city, Qing emperors built several large palatial gardens including the Old Summer Palace and the Summer Palace.

During the Second Opium War, Anglo-French forces captured the outskirts of the city, looting and burning the Old Summer Palace in 1860. Under the Convention of Peking ending that war, Western powers for the first time secured the right to establish permanent diplomatic presences within the city. From 14 to 15 August 1900 the Battle of Peking was fought. This battle was part of the Boxer Rebellion. 
The attempt by the Boxers to eradicate this presence, as well as Chinese Christian converts, led to Beijing's reoccupation by eight foreign powers. During the fighting, several important structures were destroyed, including the Hanlin Academy and the (new) Summer Palace.
A peace agreement was concluded between the Eight-Nation Alliance and representatives of the Chinese government Li Hung-chang and Prince Ching on 7 September 1901. The treaty required China to pay an indemnity of US$335 million (over US$4 billion in current dollars) plus interest over a period of 39 years. Also required was the execution or exile of government supporters of the Boxers and the destruction of Chinese forts and other defenses in much of northern China. Ten days after the treaty was signed the foreign armies left Peking, although legation guards would remain there until World War II.

With the treaty signed the Empress Dowager Cixi returned to Peking from her "tour of inspection" on 7 January 1902 and the rule of the Qing dynasty over China was restored, albeit much weakened by the defeat it had suffered in the Boxer Rebellion and by the indemnity and stipulations of the peace treaty. The Dowager died in 1908 and the dynasty imploded in 1911.

Republic of China 

The fomenters of the Xinhai Revolution of 1911 sought to replace Qing rule with a republic and leaders like Sun Yat-sen originally intended to return the capital to Nanjing. After the Qing general Yuan Shikai forced the abdication of the last Qing emperor and ensured the success of the revolution, the revolutionaries accepted him as president of the new Republic of China. Yuan maintained his capital at Beijing and quickly consolidated power, declaring himself emperor in 1915. His death less than a year later left China under the control of the warlords commanding the regional armies. Following the success of the Kuomintang's Northern Expedition, the capital was formally moved to Nanjing in 1928. On 28 June the same year, Beijing's name was returned to Beiping (written at the time as "Peiping").

On 7 July 1937, the 29th Army and the Japanese army in China exchanged fire at the Marco Polo Bridge near the Wanping Fortress southwest of the city. The Marco Polo Bridge Incident triggered the Second Sino-Japanese War, World War II as it is known in China. During the war, Beijing fell to Japan on 29 July 1937 and was made the seat of the Provisional Government of the Republic of China, a puppet state that ruled the ethnic-Chinese portions of Japanese-occupied northern China. This government was later merged into the larger Wang Jingwei government based in Nanjing.

People's Republic of China 

In the final phases of the Chinese Civil War, the People's Liberation Army seized control of the city peacefully on 31 January 1949 in the course of the Pingjin Campaign. On 1 October that year, Mao Zedong announced the creation of the People's Republic of China from atop Tian'anmen. He restored the name of the city, as the new capital, to Beijing, a decision that had been reached by the Chinese People's Political Consultative Conference just a few days earlier.

In the 1950s, the city began to expand beyond the old walled city and its surrounding neighborhoods, with heavy industries in the west and residential neighborhoods in the north. Many areas of the Beijing city wall were torn down in the 1960s to make way for the construction of the Beijing Subway and the 2nd Ring Road.

During the Cultural Revolution from 1966 to 1976, the Red Guard movement began in Beijing and the city's government fell victim to one of the first purges. By the autumn of 1966, all city schools were shut down and over a million Red Guards from across the country gathered in Beijing for eight rallies in Tian'anmen Square with Mao. In April 1976, a large public gathering of Beijing residents against the Gang of Four and the Cultural Revolution in Tiananmen Square was forcefully suppressed. In October 1976, the Gang was arrested in Zhongnanhai and the Cultural Revolution came to an end. In December 1978, the Third Plenum of the 11th Party Congress in Beijing under the leadership of Deng Xiaoping reversed the verdicts against victims of the Cultural Revolution and instituted the "policy of reform and opening up."

Since the early 1980s, the urban area of Beijing has expanded greatly with the completion of the 2nd Ring Road in 1981 and the subsequent addition of the 3rd, 4th, 5th and 6th Ring Roads. According to one 2005 newspaper report, the size of newly developed Beijing was one-and-a-half times larger than before. Wangfujing and Xidan have developed into flourishing shopping districts, while Zhongguancun has become a major center of electronics in China. In recent years, the expansion of Beijing has also brought to the forefront some problems of urbanization, such as heavy traffic, poor air quality, the loss of historic neighborhoods, and a significant influx of migrant workers from less-developed rural areas of the country. Beijing has also been the location of many significant events in recent Chinese history, principally the Tiananmen Square protests of 1989. The city has also hosted major international events, including the 2008 Summer Olympics and the 2015 World Championships in Athletics, and the 2022 Winter Olympics, making it the first city to ever host both Winter and Summer Olympics.

Geography 

Beijing is situated at the northern tip of the roughly triangular North China Plain, which opens to the south and east of the city. Mountains to the north, northwest and west shield the city and northern China's agricultural heartland from the encroaching desert steppes. The northwestern part of the municipality, especially Yanqing District and Huairou District, are dominated by the Jundu Mountains, while the western part is framed by Xishan or the Western Hills. The Great Wall of China across the northern part of Beijing Municipality was built on the rugged topography to defend against nomadic incursions from the steppes.

Major rivers flowing through the municipality, including the Chaobai, Yongding, Juma, are all tributaries in the Hai River system, and flow in a southeasterly direction. The Miyun Reservoir, on the upper reaches of the Chaobai River, is the largest reservoir within the municipality. Beijing is also the northern terminus of the Grand Canal to Hangzhou, which was built over 1,400 years ago as a transportation route, and the South–North Water Transfer Project, constructed in the past decade to bring water from the Yangtze River basin.

The city spreads out in concentric ring roads. The Second Ring Road traces the old city walls and the Sixth Ring Road connects satellite towns in the surrounding suburbs. Tian'anmen and Tian'anmen Square are at the center of Beijing, directly to the south of the Forbidden City, the former residence of the emperors of China. To the west of Tian'anmen is Zhongnanhai, the residence of China's current leaders. Chang'an Avenue, which cuts between Tiananmen and the Square, forms the city's main east–west axis.

Cityscape

Architecture 

Three styles of architecture are predominant in urban Beijing. First, there is the traditional architecture of imperial China, perhaps best exemplified by the massive Tian'anmen (Gate of Heavenly Peace), which remains the People's Republic of China's trademark edifice, the Forbidden City, the Imperial Ancestral Temple and the Temple of Heaven. Next, there is what is sometimes referred to as the "Sino-Sov" style, with structures tending to be boxy and sometimes poorly constructed, which were built between the 1950s and the 1970s. Finally, there are much more modern architectural forms, most noticeably in the area of the Beijing CBD in east Beijing such as the new CCTV Headquarters, in addition to buildings in other locations around the city such as the Beijing National Stadium and National Center for the Performing Arts.

Since 2007, buildings in Beijing have received the CTBUH Skyscraper Award for best overall tall building twice, for the Linked Hybrid building in 2009 and the CCTV Headquarters in 2013. The CTBUH Skyscraper award for best tall overall building is given to only one building around the world every year.

In the early 21st century, Beijing has witnessed tremendous growth of new building constructions, exhibiting various modern styles from international designers, most pronounced in the CBD region. A mixture of both 1950s design and neofuturistic style of architecture can be seen at the 798 Art Zone, which mixes the old with the new. Beijing's tallest building is the 528-meter China Zun.

Beijing is famous for its siheyuans, a type of residence where a common courtyard is shared by the surrounding buildings. Among the more grand examples are the Prince Gong Mansion and Residence of Soong Ching-ling. These courtyards are usually connected by alleys called hutongs. The hutongs are generally straight and run east to west so that doorways face north and south for good Feng Shui. They vary in width; some are so narrow only a few pedestrians can pass through at a time. Once ubiquitous in Beijing, siheyuans and hutongs are rapidly disappearing, as entire city blocks of hutongs are replaced by high-rise buildings. Residents of the hutongs are entitled to live in the new buildings in apartments of at least the same size as their former residences. Many complain, however, that the traditional sense of community and street life of the hutongs cannot be replaced, and these properties are often government owned.

Climate 
 Beijing has a monsoon-influenced humid continental climate (Köppen: Dwa), bordering on a cold semi-arid climate (Köppen: BSk), characterized by hot, humid summers due to the East Asian monsoon, and brief but cold, dry winters that reflect the influence of the vast Siberian anticyclone. Spring can bear witness to sandstorms blowing in from the Gobi Desert across the Mongolian steppe, accompanied by rapidly warming, but generally dry, conditions. Autumn, similar to spring, is a season of transition and minimal precipitation. Precipitation averages around  annually, with close to three-quarters of that total falling from June to August. With monthly percent possible sunshine ranging from 47% in July to 65% in January and February, the city receives 2,671 hours of bright sunshine annually.

Environmental issues 
Beijing has a long history of environmental problems. Between 2000 and 2009 Beijing's urban extent quadrupled, which not only strongly increased the extent of anthropogenic emissions, but also changed the meteorological situation fundamentally, even if emissions of human society are not included. For example, surface albedo, wind speed and humidity near the surface were decreased, whereas ground and near-surface air temperatures, vertical air dilution and ozone levels were increased. Because of the combined factors of urbanization and pollution caused by burning of fossil fuel, Beijing is often affected by serious environmental problems, which lead to health issues of many inhabitants. In 2013 heavy smog struck Beijing and most parts of northern China, impacting a total of 600 million people. After this "pollution shock" air pollution became an important economic and social concern in China. After that the government of Beijing announced measures to reduce air pollution, for example by lowering the share of coal from 24% in 2012 to 10% in 2017, while the national government ordered heavily polluting vehicles to be removed from 2015 to 2017 and increased its efforts to transition the energy system to clean sources.

Air quality 
Joint research between American and Chinese researchers in 2006 concluded that much of the city's pollution comes from surrounding cities and provinces. On average 35–60% of the ozone can be traced to sources outside the city. Shandong Province and Tianjin Municipality have a "significant influence on Beijing's air quality", partly due to the prevailing south/southeasterly flow during the summer and the mountains to the north and northwest.

In preparation for the 2008 Summer Olympics and to fulfill promises to clean up the city's air, nearly US$17 billion was spent. Beijing implemented a number of air improvement schemes for the duration of the Games, including halting work at all construction sites, closing many factories in Beijing permanently, temporarily shutting industry in neighboring regions, closing some gas stations, and cutting motor traffic by half by limiting drivers to odd or even days (based on their license plate numbers), reducing bus and subway fares, opening new subway lines, and banning high-emission vehicles. The city further assembled 3,800 natural gas-powered buses, one of the largest fleets in the world. Beijing became the first city in China to require the Chinese equivalent to the Euro 4 emission standard.

Coal burning accounts for about 40% of the PM 2.5 in Beijing and is also the chief source of nitrogen and sulphur dioxide. Since 2012, the city has been converting coal-fired power stations to burn natural gas and aims to cap annual coal consumption at 20 million tons. In 2011, the city burned 26.3 million tons of coal, 73% of which for heating and power generation and the remainder for industry. Much of the city's air pollutants are emitted by neighboring regions. Coal consumption in neighboring Tianjin is expected to increase from 48 to 63 million tons from 2011 to 2015. Hebei Province burned over 300 million tons of coal in 2011, more than all of Germany, of which only 30% were used for power generation and a considerable portion for steel and cement making. Power plants in the coal-mining regions of Shanxi, Inner Mongolia and Shaanxi, where coal consumption has tripled since 2000, and Shandong also contribute to air pollution in Beijing. Shandong, Shanxi, Hebei and Inner Mongolia, respectively rank from first to fourth, among Chinese provinces by coal consumption. There were four major coal-fired power plants in the city to provide electricity as well as heating during the winter. The first one (Gaojing Thermal Power Plant) was shut down in 2014. Another two were shut in March 2015. The last one (Huaneng Thermal Power Plant) would be shut in 2016. Between 2013 and 2017, the city planned to reduce 13 million tons of coal consumption and cap coal consumption to 15 million tons in 2015.

The government sometimes uses cloud-seeding measures to increase the likelihood of rain showers in the region to clear the air prior to large events, such as prior to the 60th anniversary parade in 2009 as well as to combat drought conditions in the area. More recently, however, the government has increased its usage of such measures as closing factories temporarily and implementing greater restrictions for cars on the road, as in the case of "APEC blue" and "parade blue," short periods during and immediately preceding the APEC China 2014 and the 2015 China Victory Day Parade, respectively. During and prior to these events, Beijing's air quality improved dramatically, only to fall back to unhealthy levels shortly after.

Beijing air quality is often poor, especially in winter. In mid-January 2013, Beijing's air quality was measured on top of the city's US embassy at a PM2.5 density of 755 micrograms per cubic meter, which is more than 75 times the safe level established by the WHO, and went off the US Environmental Protection Agency's air quality index. It was widely reported, originally through a Twitter account, that the category was "crazy bad". This was later changed to "beyond index".

On 8 and 9 December 2015 Beijing had its first smog alert which shut down a majority of the industry and other commercial businesses in the city. Later in the month another smog "red alert" was issued.

According to Beijing's environmental protection bureau's announcement in November 2016, starting from 2017 highly polluting old cars will be banned from being driven whenever Smog "red alerts" are issued in the city or neighboring regions.

In recent years, there has been measurable reductions in pollutants after the "war on pollution" was declared in 2014, with Beijing seeing a 35% reduction in fine particulates in 2017.

Readings 
Due to Beijing's high level of air pollution, there are various readings by different sources on the subject. Daily pollution readings at 27 monitoring stations around the city are reported on the website of the Beijing Environmental Protection Bureau (BJEPB). The American Embassy of Beijing also reports hourly fine particulate (PM2.5) and ozone levels on Twitter. Since the BJEPB and US Embassy measure different pollutants according to different criteria, the pollution levels and the impact to human health reported by the BJEPB are often lower than that reported by the US Embassy.

The smog is causing harm and danger to the population. The air pollution does directly result in significant impact on the mobility rate of cardiovascular disease and respiratory disease in Beijing. Exposure to large concentrations of polluted air can cause respiratory and cardiovascular problems, emergency room visits, and even death.

Dust storms 
Dust from the erosion of deserts in northern and northwestern China results in seasonal dust storms that plague the city; the Beijing Weather Modification Office sometimes artificially induces rainfall to fight such storms and mitigate their effects. In the first four months of 2006 alone, there were no fewer than eight such storms. In April 2002, one dust storm alone dumped nearly 50,000 tons of dust onto the city before moving on to Japan and Korea.

Government 

The municipal government is regulated by the local Chinese Communist Party (CCP), led by the Beijing CCP Secretary. The local CCP issues administrative orders, collects taxes, manages the economy, and directs a standing committee of the Municipal People's Congress in making policy decisions and overseeing the local government.

Government officials include the mayor and vice-mayor. Numerous bureaus focus on law, public security, and other affairs. Additionally, as the capital of China, Beijing houses all of the important national governmental and political institutions, including the National People's Congress.

Administrative divisions 

Beijing Municipality currently comprises 16 administrative county-level subdivisions including 16 urban, suburban, and rural districts. On 1 July 2010, Chongwen and Xuanwu were merged into Dongcheng and Xicheng, respectively. On 13 November 2015 Miyun and Yanqing were upgraded to districts.

Towns 

Beijing's 16 county-level divisions (districts) are further subdivided into 273 lower third-level administrative units at the township level: 119 towns, 24 townships, 5 ethnic townships and 125 subdistricts.
Towns within Beijing Municipality but outside the urban area include (but are not limited to):

 Changping  
 Huairou 
 Miyun 
 Liangxiang 
 Liulimiao 
 Tongzhou  
 Yizhuang 
 Tiantongyuan  
 Beiyuan  
 Xiaotangshan 

Several place names in Beijing end with mén, meaning "gate", as they were the locations of gates in the former Beijing city wall. Other place names end in cūn, meaning "village", as they were originally villages outside the city wall.

Judiciary and procuracy 
The judicial system in Beijing consists of the Supreme People's Court, the highest court in the country, the Beijing Municipal High People's Court, the high people's court of the municipality, three intermediate people's courts, one intermediate railway transport court, 14 basic people's court (one for each of the municipality's districts and counties), and one basic railway transport court. The Beijing No. 1 Intermediate People's Court in Shijingshan oversees the basic courts of Haidian, Shijingshan, Mentougou, Changping and Yanqing. The Beijing No. 2 Intermediate People's Court in Fengtai oversees the basic courts of Dongcheng, Xicheng, Fengtai, Fangshan and Daxing. The Beijing No. 3 Intermediate People's Court in Laiguangying, is the newest of the three intermediate people's courts and opened on 21 August 2013. It oversees the district courts of Chaoyang, Tongzhou, Shunyi, Huairou, Pinggu and Miyun. Each court in Beijing has a corresponding people's procuratorate.

Economy 

, Beijing's nominal GDP was US$458 billion (CN￥3.0 trillion), about 3.45% of the country's GDP and ranked 12th among province-level administrative units; its nominal GDP per capita was US$21,261 (CN￥140,748) and ranked the 1st in the country. As of 2021, Beijing's gross regional products was CN￥4 trillion ($965 billion in GDP PPP), ranking among the tenth largest metropolitan economies in the world. Beijing's nominal GDP is projected to reach US$1.1 trillion in 2035, ranking among the world's top 10 largest cities (together with Shanghai, Guangzhou and Shenzhen in China) according to a study by Oxford Economics, and its nominal GDP per capita will reach US$45,000 in 2030.

Due to the concentration of state owned enterprises in the national capital, Beijing in 2013 had more Fortune Global 500 Company headquarters than any other city in the world. As of August 2022, Beijing has 54 Fortune Global 500 companies, more than Japan (47), the third-place country after China (145) and the United States (124). Beijing has also been described as the "billionaire capital of the world". In 2020, Beijing is the fifth wealthiest city in the world, with a total wealth amounts to $2 trillion. Beijing is classified as an Alpha+ (global first-tier) city by the Globalization and World Cities Research Network, indicating its influence in the region and worldwide and making it one of the world's Top 10 major cities. In the 2021 Global Financial Centres Index, Beijing was ranked as having the sixth-most competitive financial center in the world and fourth-most competitive in the whole Asia & Oceania region (behind Shanghai, Hong Kong and Singapore).

As of 2021, Beijing was ranked first globally in terms of "Global City Competitiveness" in the 2020–2021 Global Urban Competitiveness Report jointly released by the Chinese Academy of Social Sciences (CASS) and the United Nations Programme for Human Settlements (UN-Habitat).

 Per-capita GDP is based on mid-year population.

Sector composition 

The city has a post-industrial economy that is dominated by the tertiary sector (services), which generated 76.9% of output, followed by the secondary sector (manufacturing, construction) at 22.2% and the primary sector (agriculture, mining) at 0.8%.

The services sector is broadly diversified with professional services, wholesale and retail, information technology, commercial real estate, scientific research, and residential real estate each contributing at least 6% to the city's economy in 2013.

The single largest sub-sector remains industry, whose share of overall output has shrunk to 18.1% in 2013. The mix of industrial output has changed significantly since 2010 when the city announced that 140 highly-polluting, energy and water resource intensive enterprises would be relocated from the city in five years. The relocation of Capital Steel to neighboring Hebei province had begun in 2005. In 2013, output of automobiles, aerospace products, semiconductors, pharmaceuticals, and food processing all increased.

In the farmland around Beijing, vegetables and fruits have displaced grain as the primary crops under cultivation. In 2013, the tonnage of vegetable, edible fungus and fruit harvested was over three times that of grain. In 2013, overall acreage under cultivation shrank along with most categories of produce as more land was reforested for environmental reasons.

Economic zones 

In 2006, the city government identified six high-end economic output zones around Beijing as the primary engines for local economic growth. In 2012, the six zones produced 43.3% of the city's GDP, up from 36.5% in 2007.
The six zones are:
 Zhongguancun, China's silicon village in Haidian District northwest of the city, is home to both established and start-up tech companies. In the first two quarters of 2014, 9,895 companies registered in the six zones, among which 6,150 were based in Zhongguancun. Zhongguancun is also the center of Beijing-Tianjin-Shijiazhuang Hi-Tech Industrial Belt. 
 Beijing Financial Street, in Xicheng District on the west side of the city between Fuxingmen and Fuchengmen, is lined with headquarters of large state banks and insurance companies. The country's financial regulatory agencies including the central bank, bank regulator, securities regulator, and foreign exchange authority are located in the neighborhood.
 Beijing Central Business District (CBD), is actually located to the east of downtown, near the embassies along the eastern Third Ring Road between Jianguomenwai and Chaoyangmenwai. The CBD is home to most of the city's skyscraper office buildings. Most of the city's foreign companies and professional service firms are based in the CBD.
 Beijing Economic and Technological Development Area, better known as Yizhuang, is an industrial park the straddles the southern Fifth Ring Road in Daxing District. It has attracted pharmaceutical, information technology, and materials engineering companies.
 Beijing Airport Economic Zone was created in 1993 and surrounds the Beijing Capital International Airport in Shunyi District northeast of the city. In addition to logistics, airline services, and trading firms, this zone is also home to Beijing's automobile assembly plants.
 Beijing Olympic Center Zone surrounds the Olympic Green due north of downtown and is developing into an entertainment, sports, tourism and business convention center.

Shijingshan, on the western outskirts of the city, is a traditional heavy industrial base for steel-making. Chemical plants are concentrated in the far eastern suburbs.

Less legitimate enterprises also exist. Urban Beijing is known for being a center of infringed goods; anything from the latest designer clothing to DVDs can be found in markets all over the city, often marketed to expatriates and international visitors.

Demographics 

In 2013, Beijing had a total population of 21.148 million within the municipality, of which 18.251 million resided in urban districts or suburban townships and 2.897 million lived in rural villages. The encompassing metropolitan area was estimated by the OECD (Organisation for Economic Co-operation and Development) to have, a population of 24.9 million.

Within China, the city ranked second in urban population after Shanghai and the third in municipal population after Shanghai and Chongqing. Beijing also ranks among the most populous cities in the world, a distinction the city has held for much of the past 800 years, especially during the 15th to early 19th centuries when it was the largest city in the world.

About 13 million of the city's residents in 2013 had local hukou permits, which entitles them to permanent residence in Beijing. The remaining 8 million residents had hukou permits elsewhere and were not eligible to receive some social benefits provided by the Beijing municipal government.

The population increased in 2013 by 455,000 or about 7% from the previous year and continued a decade-long trend of rapid growth. The total population in 2004 was 14.213 million. The population gains are driven largely by migration. The population's rate of natural increase in 2013 was a mere 0.441%, based on a birth rate of 8.93 and a mortality rate of 4.52. The gender balance was 51.6% males and 48.4% females.

Working age people account for nearly 80% of the population. Compared to 2004, residents age 0–14 as a proportion of the population dropped from 9.96% to 9.5% in 2013 and residents over the age of 65 declined from 11.12% to 9.2%. From 2000 to 2010, the percentage of city residents with at least some college education nearly doubled from 16.8% to 31.5%. About 22.2% have some high school education and 31% had reached middle school.

According to the 2010 census, nearly 96% of Beijing's population are ethnic Han Chinese. Of the 800,000 ethnic minority population living in the capital, Manchu (336,000), Hui (249,000), Korean (77,000), Mongol (37,000) and Tujia (24,000) constitute the five largest groups. In addition, there were 8,045 Hong Kong residents, 500 Macau residents, and 7,772 Taiwan residents along with 91,128 registered foreigners living in Beijing. A study by the Beijing Academy of Sciences estimates that in 2010 there were on average 200,000 foreigners living in Beijing on any given day including students, business travellers and tourists that are not counted as registered residents.

In 2017 the Chinese government implemented population controls for Beijing and Shanghai to fight what it called the "big city disease" which includes congestion, pollution, and shortages of education and health care services. From this policy, Beijing's population declined by 20,000 from 2016 to 2017. Some low-income people are being forcibly removed from the city as both legal and illegal housing is being demolished in some high-density residential neighborhoods. The population is being redistributed to Jing-Jin-Ji and Xiong'an New Area, the transfer to the latter expected to include 300,000-500,000 people working in government research, universities, and corporate headquarters.

Education and research 

Beijing is a world leading center for scientific and technological innovation and has been ranked the No.1 city in the world with the largest scientific research output, as tracked by the Nature Index since 2016. The city is also leading the world with the highest share of articles published in the fields of physical sciences, chemistry, and earth and environmental sciences, especially in the United Nations'17 Sustainable Development Goals (SDGs) related output.

Beijing has over 90 public colleges and universities, which is the largest urban public university system in Asia and the first city in China with most higher education institutions, and it is home to the two best universities (Tsinghua and Peking) in the whole of Asia-Oceania region and emerging countries with its shared rankings at 16th place in the world by the 2022 Times Higher Education World University Rankings. Both are members of the C9 League, an alliance of elite Chinese universities offering comprehensive and leading education.

Beijing also has the highest number of universities of any city in the country, representing more than one-fifth of 147 Double First-Class Universities, a national plan to develop elite Chinese universities into world-class institutions by the end of 2050. A number of Beijing's most prestigious universities consistently rank among the best in the Asia-Pacific and the world, including Peking University, Tsinghua University, Renmin University of China, Beijing Normal University, University of Chinese Academy of Sciences, Beihang University, Beijing Institute of Technology, China Agricultural University, Minzu University of China, University of Science and Technology Beijing, Beijing University of Chemical Technology, University of International Business and Economics, University of Chinese Academy of Social Sciences and Central University of Finance and Economics. These universities were selected as "985 universities" or "211 universities" by the Chinese government in order to build world-class universities.

Some of the national key universities in Beijing are:
 Beijing Forestry University
 Beijing Jiaotong University
 Beijing University of Technology
 Beijing University of Chinese Medicine
 Beijing University of Posts and Telecommunications
 Beijing Electronic Science and Technology Institute
 Beijing Foreign Studies University
 Beijing Language and Culture University
 Beijing Sport University
 Central Conservatory of Music
 Central Academy of Fine Arts
 Central Academy of Drama
 China University of Geosciences (Beijing)
 China University of Petroleum (Beijing)
 China University of Mining and Technology (Beijing)
 China University of Political Science and Law
 China Foreign Affairs University
 Chinese People's Public Security University
 China Women's University
 China Youth University for Political Sciences
 China Institute of Industrial Relations
 Communication University of China
 North China Electric Power University
 Peking Union Medical College
 University of International Relations

Beijing is also home to several religious institutions, Some of them are listed as follows:
  (中国伊斯兰教经学院)
  (北京伊斯兰教经学院)
  (中国佛学院)
  (中国藏语系高级佛学院)
 National Seminary of Catholic Church in China (中国天主教神哲学院)

The city is a seat of the Chinese Academy of Sciences, which has been consistently ranked the No.1 research institute in the world by Nature Index since the list's inception in 2014, by Nature Research. Beijing is also a site of Chinese Academy of Engineering, Chinese Academy of Social Sciences and National Natural Science Foundation of China.

The city's compulsory education system is among the best in the world: in 2018, 15-year-old students from Beijing (together with Shanghai, Zhejiang and Jiangsu) outperformed all of the other 78 participating countries in all categories (math, reading, and science) in the Program for International Student Assessment, a worldwide study of academic performance conducted by the OECD.

Culture 

People native to urban Beijing speak the Beijing dialect, which belongs to the Mandarin subdivision of spoken Chinese. This speech is the basis for putonghua, the standard spoken language used in mainland China and Taiwan, and one of the four official languages of Singapore. Rural areas of Beijing Municipality have their own dialects akin to those of Hebei province, which surrounds Beijing Municipality.

Beijing or Peking opera is a traditional form of Chinese theater well known throughout the nation. Commonly lauded as one of the highest achievements of Chinese culture, Beijing opera is performed through a combination of song, spoken dialogue, and codified action sequences involving gestures, movement, fighting and acrobatics. Much of Beijing opera is carried out in an archaic stage dialect quite different from Modern Standard Chinese and from the modern Beijing dialect.

Beijing cuisine is the local style of cooking. Peking duck is perhaps the best known dish. Fuling jiabing, a traditional Beijing snack food, is a pancake (bing) resembling a flat disk with a filling made from fu ling, a fungus used in traditional Chinese medicine. Teahouses are also common in Beijing.

The cloisonné (or Jingtailan, literally "Blue of Jingtai") metalworking technique and tradition is a Beijing art speciality, and is one of the most revered traditional crafts in China. Cloisonné making requires elaborate and complicated processes which include base-hammering, copper-strip inlay, soldering, enamel-filling, enamel-firing, surface polishing and gilding. Beijing's lacquerware is also well known for its sophisticated and intricate patterns and images carved into its surface, and the various decoration techniques of lacquer include "carved lacquer" and "engraved gold".

Younger residents of Beijing have become more attracted to the nightlife, which has flourished in recent decades, breaking prior cultural traditions that had practically restricted it to the upper class. Today, Houhai, Sanlitun and Wudaokou are Beijing's nightlife hotspots.

In 2012 Beijing was named as City of Design and became part of the UNESCO Creative Cities Network.

Places of interest 

At the historical heart of Beijing lies the Forbidden City, the enormous palace compound that was the home of the emperors of the Ming and Qing dynasties; the Forbidden City hosts the Palace Museum, which contains imperial collections of Chinese art. Surrounding the Forbidden City are several former imperial gardens, parks and scenic areas, notably Beihai, Shichahai, Zhongnanhai, Jingshan and Zhongshan. These places, particularly Beihai Park, are described as masterpieces of Chinese gardening art, and are tourist destinations of historical importance; in the modern era, Zhongnanhai has also been the political heart of various Chinese governments and regimes and is now the headquarters of the Chinese Communist Party and the State Council. From Tiananmen Square, right across from the Forbidden City, there are several notable sites, such as the Tiananmen, Qianmen, the Great Hall of the People, the National Museum of China, the Monument to the People's Heroes, and the Mausoleum of Mao Zedong. The Summer Palace and the Old Summer Palace both lie at the western part of the city; the former, a UNESCO World Heritage Site, contains a comprehensive collection of imperial gardens and palaces that served as the summer retreats for the Qing imperial family.

Among the best known religious sites in the city is the Temple of Heaven (Tiantan), located in southeastern Beijing, also a UNESCO World Heritage Site, where emperors of the Ming and Qing dynasties made visits for annual ceremonies of prayers to Heaven for good harvest. In the north of the city is the Temple of Earth (Ditan), while the Temple of the Sun (Ritan) and the Temple of the Moon (Yuetan) lie in the eastern and western urban areas respectively. Other well-known temple sites include the Dongyue Temple, Tanzhe Temple, Miaoying Temple, White Cloud Temple, Yonghe Temple, Fayuan Temple, Wanshou Temple and Big Bell Temple. The city also has its own Confucius Temple, and a Guozijian or Imperial Academy. The Cathedral of the Immaculate Conception, built in 1605, is the oldest Catholic church in Beijing. The Niujie Mosque is the oldest mosque in Beijing, with a history stretching back over a thousand years.

Beijing contains several well-preserved pagodas and stone pagodas, such as the towering Pagoda of Tianning Temple, which was built during the Liao dynasty from 1100 to 1120, and the Pagoda of Cishou Temple, which was built in 1576 during the Ming dynasty. Historically noteworthy stone bridges include the 12th-century Lugou Bridge, the 17th-century Baliqiao bridge, and the 18th-century Jade Belt Bridge. The Beijing Ancient Observatory displays pre-telescopic spheres dating back to the Ming and Qing dynasties. The Fragrant Hills (Xiangshan) is a public park that consists of natural landscaped areas as well as traditional and cultural relics. The Beijing Botanical Garden exhibits over 6,000 species of plants, including a variety of trees, bushes and flowers, and an extensive peony garden. The Taoranting, Longtan, Chaoyang, Haidian, Milu Yuan and Zizhu Yuan parks are some of the notable recreational parks in the city. The Beijing Zoo is a center of zoological research that also contains rare animals from various continents, including the Chinese giant panda.

There are 144 museums and galleries in the city. In addition to the Palace Museum in the Forbidden City and the National Museum of China, other major museums include the National Art Museum of China, the Capital Museum, the Beijing Art Museum, the Military Museum of the Chinese People's Revolution, the Geological Museum of China, the Beijing Museum of Natural History and the Paleozoological Museum of China.

Located at the outskirts of urban Beijing, but within its municipality are the Thirteen Tombs of the Ming dynasty, the lavish and elaborate burial sites of thirteen Ming emperors, which have been designated as part of the UNESCO World Heritage Site Imperial Tombs of the Ming and Qing Dynasties. The archaeological Peking Man site at Zhoukoudian is another World Heritage Site within the municipality, containing a wealth of discoveries, among them one of the first specimens of Homo erectus and an assemblage of bones of the gigantic hyena Pachycrocuta brevirostris. There are several sections of the UNESCO World Heritage Site Great Wall of China, most notably Badaling, Jinshanling, Simatai and Mutianyu. According to the World Travel & Tourism Council (WTTC), Beijing is the second highest earning tourist city in the world after Shanghai.

Intangible cultural heritage 

The cultural heritage of Beijing is rich and diverse. Starting 2006, the Beijing government started the process of selecting and preserving cultural heritages. Five cultural heritage lists have been published over the years. 288 distinct practices are categorized as cultural heritage. These 288 cultural heritages are further divided into ten categories, namely folk music, folk dance, traditional opera, melodious art, juggling and game, folk art, traditional handicraft, traditional medicine, folk literature and folklore.

 Folk music
 Zhihua Temple music
 Tongzhou shanty
 Folk dance
 Tongzhou Dragon dance
 Miliangtun Stilts
 Traditional opera
 Kunqu
 Peking opera
 Melodious art
 Xiangsheng
 Acrobatic Performance and game
 Weiqi(Go)
 Xiangqi
 Folk art
 Ivory carving
 Traditional handicraft
 Peking duck manufacturing techniques
 Cloisonné manufacturing techniques
 Traditional medicine
 Tong Ren Tang culture
 Folk literature 
 Yongding River legend
 Folklore
 Miaohui
 Lantern Festival

Religion 

The religious heritage of Beijing is rich and diverse as Chinese folk religion, Taoism, Buddhism, Confucianism, Islam and Christianity all have significant historical presence in the city. As the national capital, the city also hosts the State Administration for Religious Affairs and various state-sponsored institutions of the leading religions. In recent decades, foreign residents have brought other religions to the city. According to Wang Zhiyun of the Chinese Academy of Social Sciences in 2010 there were 2.2 million Buddhists in the city, equal to 11.2% of the total population. According to the Chinese General Social Survey of 2009, Christians constitute 0.78% of the city's population. According to a 2010 survey, Muslims constitute 1.76% of the population of Beijing.

Chinese folk religion and Taoism 
Beijing has many temples dedicated to folk religious and communal deities, many of which are being reconstructed or refurbished in the 2000s and 2010s. Yearly sacrifices to the God of Heaven at the Temple of Heaven have been resumed by Confucian groups in the 2010s.

There are temples dedicated to the worship of the Goddess in the city, one of them near the Olympic Village, and they revolve around a major cult center at Mount Miaofeng. There are also many temples consecrated to the Dragon God, to the Medicine Master, to Divus Guan (Guan Yu), to the Fire God, to the Wealth God, temples of the City God, and at least one temple consecrated to the Yellow Deity of the Chariot Shaft in Pinggu District. Many of these temples are governed by the Beijing Taoist Association, such as the Fire God Temple of the Shicha Lake, while many others are not and are governed by popular committees and locals. A great Temple of Xuanyuan Huangdi will be built in Pinggu (possibly as an expansion of the already existing shrine) within 2020, and the temple will feature a statue of the deity which will be amongst the tallest in the world.

The national Chinese Taoist Association and Chinese Taoist College have their headquarters at the White Cloud Temple of Quanzhen Taoism, which was founded in 741 and rebuilt numerous times. The Beijing Dongyue Temple outside Chaoyangmen is the largest temple of Zhengyi Taoism in the city. The local Beijing Taoist Association has its headquarters at the Lüzu Temple near Fuxingmen.

Buddhism 

11% of the population of Beijing practices East Asian Buddhism. The Buddhist Association of China, the state's supervisory organ overseeing all Buddhist institutions in mainland China, is headquartered in the Guangji Temple, a temple founded over 800 years ago during the Jin dynasty (1115–1234) in what is now Fuchengmennei. The Beijing Buddhist Association along with the Buddhist Choir and Orchestra are based in the Guanghua Temple, which dates to the Yuan dynasty over 700 years ago. The Buddhist Academy of China and its library are housed in the Fayuan Temple near Caishikou. The Fayuan Temple, which dates to the Tang dynasty 1300 years ago, is the oldest temple in urban Beijing. The Tongjiao Temple inside Dongzhimen is the city's only Buddhist nunnery.

The Xihuang Temple originally dates to the Liao dynasty. In 1651, the temple was commissioned by the Qing Emperor Shunzhi to host the visit of the Fifth Dalai Lama to Beijing. Since then, this temple has hosted the 13th Dalai Lama as well as the Sixth, Ninth and Tenth Panchen Lamas.

The largest Tibetan Buddhist Temple in Beijing is the Yonghe Temple, which was decreed by the Qing Emperor Qianlong in 1744 to serve as the residence and research facility for his Buddhist preceptor of Rölpé Dorjé the third Changkya (or living Buddha of Inner Mongolia). The Yonghe Temple is so-named because it was the childhood residence of the Yongzheng Emperor, and retains the glazed tiles reserved for imperial palaces. While the "High-level Tibetan Buddhism College of China", China's highest institution college of Tibetan Buddhism, situated near the Yonghe Temple. The Lingguang Temple of Badachu in the Western Hills also dates to the Tang dynasty. The temple's Zhaoxian Pagoda was first built in 1071 during the Liao dynasty to hold a tooth relic of the Buddha. The pagoda was destroyed during the Boxer Rebellion and the tooth was discovered from its foundation. A new pagoda was built in 1964. The six aforementioned temples: Guangji, Guanghua, Tongjiao, Xihuang, Yonghe and Lingguang have been designated National Key Buddhist Temples in Han Chinese Area.

In addition, other notable temples in Beijing include the Tanzhe Temple (founded in the Jin dynasty (266–420) is the oldest in the municipality), the Tianning Temple (oldest pagoda in the city), the Miaoying Temple (famed for Yuan-era white pagoda), the Wanshou Temple (home to the Beijing Art Museum) and the Big Bell Temple (Dazhong Temple).

Islam 

Beijing has about 70 mosques recognized by the Islamic Association of China, whose headquarters are located next to the Niujie Mosque, the oldest mosque in the city. The Niujie Mosque was founded in 996 during the Liao dynasty and is frequently visited by Muslim dignitaries. The Chinese Muslim community reportedly celebrated Ramadan and made Eid prayers at the mosque on 2021.

The largest mosque in Beijing is ChangYing mosque, located in ChaoYang district, with an area of 8,400 square meters.

Other notable mosques in the old city include the Dongsi Mosque, founded in 1346; the Huashi Mosque, founded in 1415; Nan Douya Mosque, near Chaoyangmen; Jinshifang Street Mosque, in Xicheng District; and the Dongzhimen Mosque. There are large mosques in outlying Muslim communities in Haidian, Madian, Tongzhou, Changping, Changying, Shijingshan and Miyun. The China Islamic Institute is located in the Niujie neighborhood in Xicheng District.

Christianity

Catholicism
In 1289, John of Montecorvino came to Beijing as a Franciscan missionary with the order from the Pope. After meeting and receiving the support of Kublai Khan in 1293, he built the first Catholic church in Beijing in 1305. The Chinese Patriotic Catholic Association (CPCA), based in Houhai is the government oversight body for Catholics in mainland China. Notable Catholic churches in Beijing include:
 the Nantang or Cathedral of the Immaculate Conception also known as the Xuanwumen Church, which was founded in 1605 and whose current archbishop, Joseph Li Shan, is one of the few bishops in China to have the support of both the Vatican and the CPCA.
 the Dongtang or St. Joseph's Church, better known as the Wangfujing Church, founded in 1653.
 the Beitang or Church of the Saviour, also known as the Xishiku Church, founded in 1703.
 the Xitang or Church of Our Lady of Mount Carmel also known as the Xizhimen Church, founded in 1723.
The National Seminary of Catholic Church in China is located in Daxing District.

Protestantism
The earliest Protestant churches in Beijing were founded by British and American missionaries in the second half of the 19th century. Protestant missionaries also opened schools, universities and hospitals which have become important civic institutions. Most of Beijing's Protestant churches were destroyed during the Boxer Rebellion and afterwards rebuilt. In 1958, the 64 Protestant churches in the city are reorganized into four and overseen by the state through the Three-Self Patriotic Movement.

Eastern Orthodox
There was a significant amount of Orthodox Christians in Beijing. Orthodoxy came to Beijing with Russian prisoners from the Sino-Russian border conflicts of the 17th century. In 1956, Viktor, the bishop of Beijing returned to the Soviet Union, and the Soviet embassy took over the old cathedral and demolished it. In 2007, the Russian embassy built a new church in its garden to serve the Russian Orthodox Christians in Beijing.

Media

Television and radio 

Beijing Television broadcasts on channels 1 through 10, and China Central Television, China's largest television network, maintains its headquarters in Beijing. Three radio stations feature programmes in English: Hit FM on FM 88.7, Easy FM by China Radio International on FM 91.5, and the newly launched Radio 774 on AM 774. Beijing Radio Stations is the family of radio stations serving the city.

Press 
The well-known Beijing Evening News, covering news about Beijing in Chinese, is distributed every afternoon. Other newspapers include Beijing Daily, The Beijing News, the Beijing Star Daily, the Beijing Morning News, and the Beijing Youth Daily, as well as English-language weeklies Beijing Weekend and Beijing Today. The People's Daily, Global Times and the China Daily (English) are published in Beijing as well.

Publications primarily aimed at international visitors and the expatriate community include the English-language periodicals Time Out Beijing, City Weekend, Beijing This Month, Beijing Talk, That's Beijing, and The Beijinger.

Beijing rock 
Beijing rock (Chinese:  北京摇滚) is a wide variety of rock and roll music made by rock bands and solo artists from Beijing. The first rock band in Beijing is Peking All-Stars, which was formed in 1979 by foreigners.

Famous rock bands and solo artists from Beijing include Cui Jian, Dou Wei, He Yong, Pu Shu, Tang Dynasty, Black Panther, The Flowers, 43 Baojia Street, etc.

Beijing born celebrities 
Mei Lanfang (22 October 1894 – 8 August 1961) is a Beijing opera singer. At age 15, he became an orphan and was adopted by his uncle's family. He started stage life in 1905 and became famous at 25 years old during performances in Japan. He was a pre-modern superstar, and famous for his portrayal of the Dan role, the elegant female archetype. After the Communist revolution, he served as an opera and performing art counselor in China. In November 2007, a theater namely Mei Lanfang Grand Theater opened in Xicheng District, Beijing to memorize him.

Yuan Longping (7 September 1930- 22 May 2021) is a Chinese agronomist. He studied at Southwest Agricultural University. He encountered national famine at the beginning of his career. This made him determined to solve the food shortage in China. He worked as a pioneer on hybrid rice back in 1960. His research on cross breeding wild abortive rice with mutated male-sterile rice was later involve a lot of research around the globe. In 2004, Yuan Longping was awarded the World Food Prize because he conducted pioneer research that helped transform China from food deficiency to food security within three decades.

Cui Jian (August 1960 – present) is a Chinese rock singer. Various media praised him as the father of China's rock music. He introduces western Rock to China in 1986 and mixed it with Chinese traditional music. Some of his songs are associated with movements in Chinese society such as "Nothing to My Name" and "Rock 'n' Roll on the New Long March". He also directed one movie called "Blue Sky Bones" at age 52.

Yang Jiang (17 July 1911- 25 May 2016) is a Chinese writer and translator. She was educated at a Chinese university and Oxford University. Ms. Yang was known for her fiction, plays, essay, and nonfiction. She is the first person who translates "Don Quixote" into Chinese. Later, she taught at Tsinghua University for many years and retired in 1980. Some of her representative works are the essay collection "We three" and the novel "Baptism". She died on 25 May 2016, at a hospital in Beijing.

Shu Qingchun (3 Feb 1899 – 24 August 1966), pen name Lao She, is a Chinese writer, linguist, and artist. He wrote eight million Chinese characters in entire life, is famous for long novels and scripts. In his iconic works, there are two long novels, two novellas, six short stories, and three scripts. Most of his works are depicting the poor life of Chinese citizens in the late Qing dynasty. He has been living in Britain, Singapore, and United States. During the Chinese Culture Revolution, he committed suicide by drowning in Taiping Lake.

Food Culture

Nine Gate Snacks 
Nine Gate Snacks is a food court. It is from the Qing Dynasty that brings together about half of Beijing's most famous specialties. It is situated in a nearly 3,000 square meter old courtyard on the northern perimeter of Shichahai, a scenic area in Beijing. Its location is to the west of Song Qingling's former residence, and it consists of 12 vintage snack bars.

Traditional Beijing Snacks 
Beside of Nine Gate Snacks, there are lots of other traditional Beijing snacks. For example, Ludagun, Aiwowo, Douzhi, Jiaoquan, Chao gan, and Wandouhuang.

Traditional Beijing Hot Pot 
In Beijing traditional hot pot, copper pots are utilized, and carbon is inserted in the center to generate heat. The broth served in this type of hot pot is solely clear soup, without any other flavor options. The dipping sauce is sesame sauce.

Sports

Events 

Beijing has hosted numerous international and national sporting events, the most notable was the 2008 Summer Olympic and Paralympic Games. Other multi-sport international events held in Beijing include the 2001 Universiade and the 1990 Asian Games. Single-sport international competitions include the Beijing Marathon (annually since 1981), China Open of Tennis (1993–97, annually since 2004), ISU Grand Prix of Figure Skating Cup of China (2003, 2004, 2005, 2008, 2009 and 2010), WPBSA China Open for Snooker (annually since 2005), Union Cycliste Internationale Tour of Beijing (since 2011), 1961 World Table Tennis Championships, 1987 IBF Badminton World Championships, the 2004 AFC Asian Cup (football), and 2009 Barclays Asia Trophy (football). Beijing hosted the 2015 IAAF World Championships in Athletics.

Beijing's LeSports Center is one of the main venues for the 2019 FIBA Basketball World Cup.

The city hosted the second Chinese National Games in 1914 and the first four National Games of China in 1959, 1965, 1975, 1979, respectively, and co-hosted the 1993 National Games with Sichuan and Qingdao. Beijing also hosted the inaugural National Peasants' Games in 1988 and the sixth National Minority Games in 1999.

In November 2013, Beijing made a bid to host the 2022 Winter Olympics. On 31 July 2015, the International Olympic Committee awarded the 2022 Winter Olympics to the city becoming the first ever to host both Summer and Winter Olympics also for the 2022 Winter Paralympics becoming the first ever to host both Summer and Winter Paralympics.

Venues 
Major sporting venues in the city include the National Stadium, also known as the "Birds' Nest", National Aquatics Center, also known as the "Water Cube", National Indoor Stadium, all in the Olympic Green to the north of downtown; the MasterCard Center at Wukesong west of downtown; the Workers' Stadium and Workers' Arena in Sanlitun just east of downtown and the Capital Arena in Baishiqiao, northeast of downtown. In addition, many universities in the city have their own sport facilities.

In Olympic Winter Games Beijing 2022, Beijing divided the competition into three competition zones. They are Beijing, Yanqing (the suburb of Beijing), and Zhangjiakou. The government built a high-speed railway between Beijing and Zhangjiakou. It takes 20 minutes to travel from Beijing to Yanqing and 50 minutes from Beijing to Zhangjiakou by high-speed rail.

The "Birds' Nest" not hosted for any competition events, except for the opening and closing ceremonies. Beijing National Aquatics Center, also called "Water Cube", changed to "Ice Cube". This is called the “Water Cube” because he was built in the 2008 Summer Olympics to serve as a swimming competition venue. In the 2022 Winter Olympics, it was used as a competition venue for ice events, so it was renamed the “Ice Cube”.  Specifically, it host for curling competition. Capital Indoor Stadium was responsible for short track speed skating and Figure skating.

For the 2022 Winter Olympics, the government has also built two new venues. National Speed Skating Stadium, also called "ice ribbon", hosted speed skating. Another new stadium built in Shougang, "Shougang Ski Jump," and held the events of Freestyle Skiing and Snowboarding.

Clubs 
Professional sports teams based in Beijing include:

 China Baseball League
 Beijing Tigers
 Chinese Basketball Association
 Beijing Ducks
 Beijing Royal Fighters
 Women's Chinese Basketball Association
 Beijing Shougang
 Kontinental Hockey League
 HC Kunlun Red Star
 Chinese Super League
 Beijing Guoan
 China League One
 Beijing BSU
 China League Two
 Beijing BIT
 Chinese Women's National League
 Beijing BG Phoenix

The Beijing Olympians of the American Basketball Association, formerly a Chinese Basketball Association team, kept their name and maintained a roster of primarily Chinese players after moving to Maywood, California in 2005.

China Bandy Federation is based in Beijing, one of several cities in which the potential for bandy development is explored.

Transportation 

Beijing is an important transport hub in North China with six ring roads, 1167 km (725 miles) of expressways, 15 National Highways, nine conventional railways, and six high-speed railways converging on the city.

Rail and high-speed rail 
Beijing serves as a large rail hub in China's railway network. Ten conventional rail lines radiate from the city to: Shanghai (Jinghu Line), Guangzhou (Jingguang Line), Kowloon (Jingjiu Line), Harbin (Jingha Line) (including Qinhuangdao (Jingqin Line)), Baotou (Jingbao Line), Chengde (Jingcheng Line), Tongliao, Inner Mongolia (Jingtong Line), Yuanping, Shanxi (Jingyuan Line) and Shacheng, Hebei (Fengsha Line). In addition, the Datong–Qinhuangdao railway passes through the municipality to the north of the city.

Beijing also has six high-speed rail lines: the Beijing–Tianjin intercity railway, which opened in 2008; the Beijing–Shanghai high-speed railway, which opened in 2011; the Beijing–Guangzhou high-speed railway, which opened in 2012; and the Beijing–Xiong'an intercity railway and the Beijing–Zhangjiakou intercity railway, both of which opened in 2019. The Beijing–Shenyang high-speed railway was completed in 2021.

The city's main railway stations are the Beijing railway station, which opened in 1959; the Beijing West railway station, which opened in 1996; and the Beijing South railway station, which was rebuilt into the city's high-speed railway station in 2008; The Beijing North railway station, was first built in 1905 and expanded in 2009; The Qinghe railway station, was first built in 1905 and expanded in 2019; The Beijing Chaoyang railway station opened in 2021; The Beijing Fengtai railway station opened in 2022; and the Beijing Sub-Center railway station is under construction.

Smaller stations in the city including Beijing East railway station and Daxing Airport station handle mainly commuter passenger traffic. In outlying suburbs and counties of Beijing, there are over 40 railway stations.

From Beijing, direct passenger train service is available to most large cities in China. International train service is available to Mongolia, Russia, Vietnam and North Korea. Passenger trains in China are numbered according to their direction in relation to Beijing.

Roads and expressways 

Beijing is connected by road links to all parts of China as part of the National Trunk Road Network. Many expressways of China serve Beijing, as do 15 China National Highways. Beijing's urban transport is dependent upon the "ring roads" that concentrically surround the city, with the Forbidden City area marked as the geographical center for the ring roads. The ring roads appear more rectangular than ring-shaped. There is no official "1st Ring Road". The 2nd Ring Road is located in the inner city. Ring roads tend to resemble expressways progressively as they extend outwards, with the 5th and 6th Ring Roads being full-standard national expressways, linked to other roads only by interchanges. Expressways to other regions of China are generally accessible from the 3rd Ring Road outward. A final outer orbital, the Capital Area Loop Expressway (G95), was fully opened in 2018 and will extend into neighboring Tianjin and Hebei.

Within the urban core, city streets generally follow the checkerboard pattern of the ancient capital. Many of Beijing's boulevards and streets with "inner" and "outer" are still named in relation to gates in the city wall, though most gates no longer stand. Traffic jams are a major concern. Even outside of rush hour, several roads still remain clogged with traffic.

Beijing's urban design layout further exacerbates transportation problems. The authorities have introduced several bus lanes, which only public buses can use during rush hour. In the beginning of 2010, Beijing had 4 million registered automobiles. By the end of 2010, the government forecast 5 million. In 2010, new car registrations in Beijing averaged 15,500 per week.

Towards the end of 2010, the city government announced a series of drastic measures to tackle traffic jams, including limiting the number of new license plates issued to passenger cars to 20,000 a month and barring cars with non-Beijing plates from entering areas within the Fifth Ring Road during rush hour. More restrictive measures are also reserved during major events or heavily polluted weather.

Road signs began to be standardized with both Chinese and English names displayed, with location names using pinyin, in 2008.

Air

Beijing Capital International Airport

Beijing has two of the world's largest airports. Capital Airport's Terminal 3, built during the expansion for the 2008 Olympics, is one of the largest in the world. Capital Airport is the main hub for Air China and Hainan Airlines. The Airport Expressway and Second Airport Expressway, connect to Capital Airport from the northeast and east of the city center, respectively. Driving time from city center is about 40 minutes under normal traffic conditions. The Capital Airport Express line of Beijing Subway and the Capital Airport Bus serves the Capital Airport.

Beijing Daxing International Airport

The Daxing Airport has one of the world's largest terminal buildings and is expected to be a major airport serving Beijing, Tianjin and northern Hebei Province. Daxing Airport is connected to the city via the Beijing–Xiong'an intercity railway, the Daxing Airport Express line of the Beijing Subway and two expressways.

Other airports
Other airports in the city at Liangxiang, Xijiao, Shahe and Badaling are primarily for military use.

Visa requirements for air passengers
, tourists from 45 countries are permitted a 72-hour visa-free stay in Beijing. The 45 countries include Singapore, Japan, the United States, Canada, all EU and EEA countries (except Norway and Liechtenstein), Switzerland, Brazil, Argentina and Australia. The programme benefits transit and business travellers with the 72 hours calculated starting from the moment visitors receive their transit stay permits rather than the time of their plane's arrival. Foreign visitors are not permitted to leave Beijing for other Chinese cities during the 72 hours.

Public transit 

It is the longest subway system in the world and first in annual ridership with 3.66 billion rides delivered in 2016. In 2013, with a flat fare of ¥2.00 (US$0.31) per ride with unlimited transfers on all lines except the Airport Express, the subway was also the most affordable rapid transit system in China. The subway is undergoing rapid expansion and is expected to reach 30 lines, 450 stations,  in length by 2022. When fully implemented, 95% of residents inside the Fourth Ring Road will be able to walk to a station in 15 minutes. The Beijing Suburban Railway provides commuter rail service to outlying suburbs of the municipality.

On 28 December 2014, the Beijing Subway switched to a distance-based fare system from a fixed fare for all lines except the Airport Express. Under the new system a trip under  will cost ¥3.00(US$0.49), an additional ¥1.00 will be added for the next  and the next  until the distance for the trip reaches . For every  after the original  an additional ¥1.00 is added. For example, a  trip would cost ¥ 8.00.

There are nearly 1,000 public bus and trolleybus lines in the city, including four bus rapid transit lines. Standard bus fares are as low as ¥1.00 when purchased with the Yikatong metrocard.

Taxi 
Most taxis are Hyundai Elantras, Hyundai Sonatas, Peugeots, Citroëns and Volkswagen Jettas. After , the base fare increases by 50% (but is only applied to the portion over that distance). Different companies have special colours combinations painted on their vehicles. Usually registered taxis have yellowish brown as basic hue, with another color of Prussian blue, hunter green, white, umber, tyrian purple, rufous, or sea green. Between 11 pm and 5 am, there is also a 20% fee increase. Tolls during trip should be covered by customers and the costs of trips beyond Beijing city limits should be negotiated with the driver. The cost of unregistered taxis is also subject to negotiation with the driver.

Bicycles 

Beijing has long been well known for the number of bicycles on its streets. Although the rise of motor traffic has created a great deal of congestion and bicycle use has declined, bicycles are still an important form of local transportation. Many cyclists can be seen on most roads in the city, and most of the main roads have dedicated bicycle lanes. Beijing is relatively flat, which makes cycling convenient. The rise of electric bicycles and electric scooters, which have similar speeds and use the same cycle lanes, may have brought about a revival in bicycle-speed two-wheeled transport. It is possible to cycle to most parts of the city. Because of the growing traffic congestion, the authorities have indicated more than once that they wish to encourage cycling, but it is not clear whether there is sufficient will to translate that into action on a significant scale. On 30 March 2019, a 6.5 km (4 mile) bicycle-dedicated lane was opened, easing the traffic congestion between Huilongguan and Shangdi where there are many high-tech companies. Cycling has seen a resurgence in popularity spurred by the emergence of a large number of dockless app based bikeshares such as Mobike, Bluegogo and Ofo since 2016.

Defence and aerospace 

The command headquarters of China's military forces are based in Beijing. The Central Military Commission, the political organ in charge of the military, is housed inside the Ministry of National Defense, located next to the Military Museum of the Chinese People's Revolution in western Beijing. The Second Artillery Corps, which controls the country's strategic missile and nuclear weapons, has its command in Qinghe, Haidian District. The headquarters of the Central Theater Command, one of five nationally, is based further west in Gaojing. The CTR oversees the Beijing Capital Garrison as well as the 27th, 38th and 65th Armies, which are based in Hebei.

Military institutions in Beijing also include academies and thinktanks such as the PLA National Defence University and Academy of Military Science, military hospitals such as the 301, 307 and the Academy of Military Medical Sciences, and army-affiliated cultural entities such as 1 August Film Studios and the PLA Song and Dance Troupe.

The China National Space Administration, which oversees country's space program, and several space-related state owned companies such as CASTC and CASIC are all based in Beijing. The Beijing Aerospace Command and Control Center, in Haidian District tracks the country's crewed and uncrewed flight and other space exploration initiatives.

Nature and wildlife 
The mountains to the west and north of the city are home to a number of protected wildlife species including leopard, leopard cat, wolf, red fox, wild boar, masked palm civet, raccoon dog, hog badger, Siberian weasel, Amur hedgehog, roe deer, and mandarin rat snake. The Beijing Aquatic Wildlife Rescue and Conservation Center protects the Chinese giant salamander, Amur stickleback and mandarin duck on the Huaijiu and Huaisha Rivers in Huairou District. The Beijing Milu Park south of the city is home to one of the largest herds of Père David's deer, now extinct in the wild. The Beijing barbastelle, a species of vesper bat discovered in caves of Fangshan District in 2001 and identified as a distinct species in 2007, is endemic to Beijing. The mountains of Fangshan are also habitat for the more common Beijing mouse-eared bat, large myotis, greater horseshoe bat and Rickett's big-footed bat.

Each year, Beijing hosts 200–300 species of migratory birds including the common crane, black-headed gull, swan, mallard, common cuckoo and the endangered yellow-breasted bunting. In May 2016, Common cuckoos nesting in the wetlands of Cuihu (Haidian), Hanshiqiao (Shunyi), Yeyahu (Yanqing) were tagged and have been traced to far as India, Kenya and Mozambique. In the fall of 2016, the Beijing Forest Police undertook a month-long campaign to crack down on illegal hunting and trapping of migratory birds for sale in local bird markets. Over 1,000 rescued birds of protected species including streptopelia, Eurasian siskin, crested myna, coal tit and great tit were handed to the Beijing Wildlife Protection and Rescue Center for repatriation to the wild.

The city flowers are the Chinese rose and chrysanthemum. The city trees are the Chinese arborvitae, an evergreen in the cypress family and the pagoda tree, also called the Chinese scholar tree, a deciduous tree of the family Fabaceae. The oldest scholar tree in the city was planted in what is now Beihai Park during the Tang dynasty.

International relations 
The capital is the home of the Asian Infrastructure Investment Bank, a multilateral development bank that aims to improve economic and social outcomes in Asia and the Silk Road Fund, an investment fund of the Chinese government to foster increased investment and provide financial supports in countries along the One Belt, One Road. Beijing is also home to the headquarters of the Shanghai Cooperation Organisation (SCO), making it an important city for international diplomacy.

Twin towns and sister cities 

Beijing is twinned with the following regions, cities, and counties:
 Addis Ababa, Ethiopia
 Ankara, Turkey
 Astana, Kazakhstan
 Athens, Greece
 Bangkok, Thailand
 Berlin, Germany
 Brussels, Belgium
 Bucharest, Romania
 Budapest, Hungary
 Buenos Aires, Argentina
 Cairo, Egypt
 Canberra, Australia
 Cologne, Germany
 Copenhagen, Denmark
 Delhi, India
 Doha, Qatar
 Dublin, Ireland
 Hanoi, Vietnam
 Havana, Cuba
 Île-de-France, France
 Islamabad, Pakistan
 Jakarta, Indonesia
 Johannesburg, South Africa 
 Kyiv, Ukraine
 Lima, Peru
 London, England, United Kingdom
 Manila, Philippines
 Minsk, Belarus
 Mexico City, Mexico
 Moscow, Russia
 New South Wales, Australia
 New York City, United States
 Ottawa, Canada
 Phnom Penh, Cambodia
 Riga, Latvia
 Rio de Janeiro, Brazil
 San José, Costa Rica
 Santiago, Chile
 Seoul, South Korea
 Tallinn, Estonia
 Tehran, Iran
 Tel Aviv, Israel
 Tirana, Albania
 Tokyo, Japan
 Ulaanbaatar, Mongolia
 Vientiane, Laos
 Washington D.C., United States
 Wellington, New Zealand

Foreign embassies and consulates 
In 2019, China had the largest diplomatic network in the world. China hosts a large diplomatic community in its capital city of Beijing. At present, the capital of Beijing hosts 172 embassies, 1 consulate and 3 representatives, excluding Hong Kong and Macau trade office.

 
 
 
 
 
 
 
 
 
 
 
 
 
 
 
 
 
 
 
 
 
 
 
 
 
 
 
 
 
 
 
 
 
 
 
 
 
 
 
 
 
 
 
 
 
 
 
 
 
 
 
 
 
 
 
 
 
 
 
 
 
 
 
 
 
 
 
 
 
 
 
 
 
 
 
 
 
 
 
 
 
 
 
 
 
 
 
 
 
 
 
 
 
 
 
 
 
 
 
 
 
 
  (consulate)

Representative offices and delegations 
  (Representative Office)
  (Representative Office)
  (Delegation of the European Union to China)

See also 

 Beijing city fortifications
 Historical capitals of China
 Large Cities Climate Leadership Group
 List of hospitals in Beijing
 List of mayors of Beijing
 List of twin towns and sister cities in China
 List of diplomatic missions in China
 Uyghurs in Beijing

Notes

References

Citations

Sources

Further reading 

 
 
 
   (Print & eBook).

External links 

 Economic profile for Beijing at HKTDC
 Visit Beijing Facebook page
 Photograph of The approach to Peking – outside the walls taken in 1890 by Sir Henry Norman

 
Municipalities of China

Articles containing video clips
Capitals in Asia
Metropolitan areas of China
North China Plain
Populated places established in the 2nd millennium BC
11th-century BC establishments in China